John T. Apperson (December 23, 1834 – April 3, 1917) was an American steamboat captain and military officer who also served in the Oregon Legislative Assembly.  He was born in Christian County, Kentucky, son of Beverly Apperson and Jane Gilbert Tubbs.  He was a steamboat captain and owner on the Willamette River in the 1850s. He served as a first lieutenant in Company "E" of the Oregon Cavalry during the American Civil War.

He was sheriff of Clackamas County. In 1889, he served again in the Oregon House of Representatives, after being elected to a seat in 1888.

Steamboat owner
In 1861, Apperson built the steamboat Unio on the Willamette River at Canemah, Oregon and operated it from its launching in October 1861 to December of the same year, when Apperson sold the boat to another steamboat captain, James D. Miller.  Despite having sold Unio to Miller, Apperson as of April 1862, held a position on the boat as clerk.

Death
Apperson died on April 3, 1917, at his home in the Park Place neighborhood of Oregon City, where he had resided with his wife, Mary Ann Elliott Apperson. He is buried at the Mountain View Cemetery, in Oregon City.

References
 Hidden History of Civil War Oregon, by Randol B. Fletcher, History Press, Charleston, SC (2011), p. 16
 An Illustrated History of the State of Oregon, by Harvey Kimball Hines, Lewis Publishing Co., 1893, pp. 545–547

External links
 
 Civil War letters in University of Oregon archives

Ship owners
Steamship captains
Oregon pioneers
Republican Party members of the Oregon House of Representatives
Republican Party Oregon state senators
19th-century American politicians
Oregon sheriffs
People of Oregon in the American Civil War
Union Army officers
1834 births
1917 deaths
People from Christian County, Kentucky
Politicians from Oregon City, Oregon
American businesspeople in shipping
19th-century American businesspeople